Caucaia Esporte Clube, commonly known as Caucaia, is a Brazilian men's and women's football club based in Caucaia, Ceará state. The women's team competed twice in the Copa do Brasil de Futebol Feminino.

History
The club was founded on 25 November 2001.

Men's team
They won the Campeonato Cearense Third Level in 2009.

Women's team
Caucaia competed for the first time in the Copa do Brasil de Futebol Feminino in 2008, when they were eliminated in the First Round by Tiradentes. They competed again in 2009, when they were eliminated in the Quarterfinals by São Francisco.

Achievements
 Campeonato Cearense:
 Runner-up (1): 2022

 Campeonato Cearense Third Level:
 Winners (1): 2009

Stadium
Caucaia Esporte Clube play their home games at Estádio Raimundo de Oliveira Filho, nicknamed Raimundão. The stadium has a maximum capacity of 3,000 people.

References

Association football clubs established in 2001
Football clubs in Ceará
Women's football clubs in Brazil
2001 establishments in Brazil